Bluefield High School (BHS) is a public secondary school in Bluefield, West Virginia, United States.  It is part of Mercer County Public Schools and is located at 535 West Cumberland Road. As of the 2018-2019 school year, enrollment was 609 students.

The school built a new library in 1998, which was later named after longtime librarian Mary Chmara.

History 

Originally Beaver High School, named for the Beaver Pond District and the future mascot, the downtown high school was established in 1903, in the fast-developing Bluefield, West Virginia. Its first graduate was in 1907, Mary Aaron. The first class, composed of ten students, graduated in 1910. The current Bluefield High School was built on West Cumberland Road and opened to students in the fall of 1957. The former Beaver High School building served as Central Junior High School for several decades. BHS, the home of the Beavers, is the oldest high school building in Mercer County.

Sports 
 Sports teams currently play in the WVSSAC at the AA level.

State championships 

Bluefield High School has won more state championships for all sports combined than any other AA school in West Virginia. The girls swim team was the 1999 runner-up in the state championship meet. In 2012, the boys soccer team was regional champions for the first time since 1985, where they made it to the state semifinals. From 1959 to 2017, the Bluefield High School football team had a winning percentage of .728.

The classic Beaver/Graham football game is the biggest event each year for the two Bluefields. This game between cross-city rivals Bluefield High School and Graham High School is  held at Mitchell Stadium. In 1991, the two schools were featured on the ESPN show Scholastic Sports America for having one of the largest high school football rivalries on the East Coast. The Beavers hold a winning record over Graham in the series, 62-24-2.

The Bluefield Beaver Band has won many awards.

References

External links
 Bluefield High School website
 The Beaver Voice

Public high schools in West Virginia
Schools in Mercer County, West Virginia
Educational institutions established in 1953
1953 establishments in West Virginia
Buildings and structures in Bluefield, West Virginia